There were four cycling events at the 2010 South American Games: road cycling, track cycling, mountain bike and BMX racing, adding up to 28 events. The events were held over March 17–23.

Medal summary

Road cycling

Track cycling

Mountain biking

BMX

Medal table

References

 
2010 South American Games
South American Games
International cycle races hosted by Colombia